Blues-ette is an album by American trombonist Curtis Fuller recorded in 1959 and released on the Savoy label.

Reception

The Allmusic website awarded the album 4½ stars stating "Sessions in any genre of music are all too often described as "sublime," but seldom has that description been better deserved than with this relaxed hard bop classic... Any serious jazz collection is incomplete without this record. Period".

Track listing
All compositions by Curtis Fuller except where noted
 "Five Spot After Dark" (Benny Golson) - 5:18     
 "Undecided" (Sydney Robin, Charlie Shavers) - 7:09     
 "Blues-ette" - 5:31     
 "Minor Vamp" (Golson) - 5:12     
 "Love Your Spell Is Everywhere" (Edmund Goulding, Elsie Janis) - 7:07     
 "Twelve-Inch" - 6:28

Personnel
Curtis Fuller - trombone
Benny Golson - tenor saxophone
Tommy Flanagan - piano
Jimmy Garrison - bass
Al Harewood - drums

References 

1960 albums
Savoy Records albums
Curtis Fuller albums
Albums recorded at Van Gelder Studio
Albums produced by Ozzie Cadena